Fregattenkapitän, short: FKpt / in lists: FK, is the middle field officer rank in the German Navy.

Address 
In line with ZDv 10/8, the official manner of formally addressing military personnel holding the rank of Fregattenkapitän (OF-4) is “Herr/Frau Fregattenkapitän“. However, following German naval tradition the “Fregattenkapitän“ is usually addressed as „Herr/Frau Kapitän“ or in seamen's language as „Herr/Frau Kap'tän“.

Rank Insignia and Rating 
Rank insignia Fregattenkapitän, worn on the sleeves and shoulders, are one five-pointed star above three stripes and a half stripe between stripe two and one (or rings on sleeves; without the star when rank loops are worn).

The rank is rated OF-4 in NATO, and is equivalent to Oberstleutnant in Heer, and Luftwaffe. It is domiciled at the A14 and A15 pay scale of the Federal Ministry of Defence and is senior to the rank of Korvettenkapitän (NATO OF-3 - Commander Junior Grade).

It is of note that, whereas the equivalent ranks (with the same insignia stripes) in Belgium and Denmark are NATO-translated as Commander Senior Grade, the German equivalent is simply termed Commander.

Volksmarine 

In the Volksmarine of the GDR Fregattenkapitän was the middle grade of the senior officers' rank group, also comparable to NATO-rank code OF-4. It was comparable to the Oberstleutnant of the NPA Land Force and Air Force.

The rank insignia consisted of a shoulder strap and sleeve stripes. Shoulder straps had to be worn on uniform jackets and consisted of twisted of silver-braids with two gold pips (stars) on padding in navy blue weapon color.

Cuff insignia consisted of four stripes, and a five-point naval star above. In contradiction to Imperial-German Navy tradition, where sleeve rings encircled the lower cuffs, the Volksmarine cuff strips formed 40% rings.

Imperial German Navy and Kriegsmarine 

In the Imperial German Navy and Kriegsmarine the "Fregattenkapitän" was the middle officer rank of the senior officers' rank group. The rank insignia consisted of shoulder strap and sleeve stripes. Shoulder straps had to be worn on uniform jackets and consisted of twisted silver-braids with one gold pip (star) on padding in navy blue weapon color.

Cuff insignia consisted of three stripes, one half stripe (half stripe between stripe two and three), and a five-point naval star above. The sleeve rings encircled the lower cuffs.

See also 
Frigate Captain
Commander

References 

Naval ranks of Germany